Senator Good may refer to:

John G. Good (1926–2003), Pennsylvania State Senate
Vinal G. Good (1906–2000), Maine State Senate
P. Wayne Goode (born 1937), Missouri State Senate
Virgil Goode (born 1946), Virginia State Senate